Die Camper (English: The Campers) is a German television series. It revolves around the group of friends and fellow camper Hajo (Michael Brandner), Heidi Wüpper (Sabine Kaack), daughter Nicole (Wolke Hegenbarth), Dieter Denkelmann (Heinrich Schafmeister) and Roswitha Fischer (Katharina Schubert).

After season 1 the cast was replaced by Benno (Willi Thomczyk) and Uschi Ewermann (Antje Lewald) as well as Lothar (René Heinersdorff) and Stefanie Fuchs (Dana Golombek).

Location
Die Camper was filmed at a real campingsite in Odenthal.

See also
List of German television series

External links

German comedy television series
1997 German television series debuts
2006 German television series endings
German-language television shows
RTL (German TV channel) original programming